Kamar is an Indic language spoken by a tribal people of central India. It is spoken in two districts, one in Madhya Pradesh and one in Chhattisgarh.

References

Eastern Indo-Aryan languages